John Atherton (1598–1640) was an Anglican bishop.

John Atherton may also refer to:

John Atherton (died 1573) (c. 1513–1573), MP for Lancashire in 1559
John Atherton (died 1617) (c. 1557–1617), MP for Lancashire in 1586 and Lancaster in 1589
John Atherton (pioneer) (1837–1913), English explorer of Queensland, Australia
John Carlton Atherton (1900–1952), American artist 
John McDougal Atherton (1841–1932), American businessman, property developer and politician
John W. Atherton (1916–2001), founding president of Pitzer College